Guidetti is an Italian surname that may refer to
Daria Guidetti, Italian astrophysicist 
Giovanni Guidetti (born 1972), Italian volleyball coach
John Guidetti (born 1992), Swedish football player
Luca Guidetti (born 1986), Italian footballer 

Italian-language surnames
Patronymic surnames
Surnames from given names